Giovanni Battista Cambiaso (Genoa, July 19, 1711 - Genoa, December 23, 1772) was the 171st Doge of the Republic of Genoa.

Biography 
On 16 April 1771 Cambiaso was elected doge with 276 votes out of 366 and on 8 February 1772 the sumptuous coronation ceremony took place, on this occasion the Arcadians wanted to celebrate it with a poetic Serto including various sonnets and songs. Cambiaso, still in office, died suddenly from unknown reasons on December 23, 1772, at 61 years old.

See also 

 Republic of Genoa
 Doge of Genoa

References 

18th-century Doges of Genoa
1711 births
1772 deaths